The ARIA Music Award for Best Country Album, is an award presented at the annual ARIA Music Awards, which recognises "the many achievements of Aussie artists across all music genres", since 1987. It is handed out by the Australian Recording Industry Association (ARIA), an organisation whose aim is "to advance the interests of the Australian record industry."

Winners and nominees
In the following table, the winner is highlighted in a separate colour, and in boldface; the nominees are those that are not highlighted or in boldface. Kasey Chambers has most wins with 9 awards from 9 nominations, more than any other artist or band in this category. Full nominees for 1988 are not available in published sources.

References

External links
 

C
Country music awards
Album awards